The 2018–19 season of Clube Desportivo Primeiro de Agosto is the club's 41st season in the Girabola, the Angolan Premier football League and 41st consecutive season in the top flight of Angolan football. In 2019,  the club is participating in the Girabola, the Angola Cup and the 2018–19 CAF Champions League.

FAF Penalty
As a result of a match-fixing investigation launched by the Angolan Football Federation (FAF) on the 17th round match between Desportivo da Huila and 1º de Agosto, each team forfeited 3 points and a $5,000 fine.

Squad information

Players

Staff

Pre-season transfers

Mid-season transfers

Overview

CAF Champions League

Preliminary round

Results summary

Angolan League

League table

Match details

Results

Results summary

Results by round

Results overview

Angola Cup

Round of 16

Quarter finals

Semi finals

Final

Statistics

Appearances and goals

|-
! colspan="13" style="background:#DCDCDC; text-align:center" | Goalkeepers

|-
! colspan="13" style="background:#DCDCDC; text-align:center" | Defenders

|-
! colspan="13" style="background:#DCDCDC; text-align:center" | Midfielders

|-
! colspan="13" style="background:#DCDCDC; text-align:center" | Forwards

|-
! colspan=13 style=background:#DCDCDC; text-align:center| Players transferred out during the season

|-
! colspan=13 style=background:#DCDCDC; text-align:center| Opponents

Scorers

Clean sheets

Disciplinary record

Season progress

See also
 List of C.D. Primeiro de Agosto players

External links
 Official website
 Facebook profile
 Zerozero.pt profile
 Match schedule

References

C.D. Primeiro de Agosto seasons
Primeiro de Agosto